The world record progression 10,000 m speed skating men as recognised by the International Skating Union:

References
 Historical World Records. International Skating Union.
 

World 10000 men